The Outsider is a 1931 British drama film directed by Harry Lachman and starring Joan Barry, Harold Huth and Norman McKinnel. The screenplay concerns an unorthodox osteopath who cures one of his patients, the daughter of a fellow Doctor. It was made at Elstree Studios and based on the 1923 play of the same title by Dorothy Brandon, previously made into an American silent film in 1926. The film's sets were designed by Wilfred Arnold.

Harold Huth's performance was voted the best in a British film in 1931. The film was remade in 1939 as The Outsider with George Sanders and Mary Maguire in the leading roles.

Cast
 Joan Barry as Lalage Sturdee
 Harold Huth as Anton Ragatzy
 Norman McKinnel as Jasper Sturdee
 Frank Lawton as Basil Owen
 Mary Clare as Mrs. Coates
 Glenore Pointing as Carol
 Annie Esmond as Pritchard
 Sidney J. Gillett as Dr. Ladd
 Randolph McLeod as Sir Nathan Israel
 Fewlass Llewellyn as Sir Montague Tollemach

References

Bibliography

External links

1931 films
1931 drama films
Films directed by Harry Lachman
Metro-Goldwyn-Mayer films
British drama films
Films set in London
British black-and-white films
British films based on plays
Films shot at British International Pictures Studios
1930s English-language films
1930s British films